Edward Dougherty House is a historic home located in East Fallowfield Township, Chester County, Pennsylvania. It was built in 1796, and is a -story, four bay, fieldstone dwelling with a gable roof in a conservative Federal style.  It features a verandah on three sides of the building.  Edward Dougherty was the brother of Philip Dougherty, who built the Philip Dougherty House and Philip Dougherty Tavern.

It was added to the National Register of Historic Places in 1985.

References

Houses on the National Register of Historic Places in Pennsylvania
Federal architecture in Pennsylvania
Houses completed in 1796
Houses in Chester County, Pennsylvania
National Register of Historic Places in Chester County, Pennsylvania
1796 establishments in Pennsylvania